Cakewalk was a sequencer first developed by Twelve Tone Systems, Inc. (the company later known as Cakewalk, Inc.).

Originally for DOS, starting with version Cakewalk 1.0 in 1987, and, beginning in 1991, for Windows 3.0. Cakewalk, until version 4.0 required an MPU-401 MIDI interface card operating in intelligent mode, while 4.0 and later versions relied on the dumb UART mode only. Cakewalk was delivered in two versions, Cakewalk Pro and Cakewalk Express.

The latter was a lite version limited to 25 tracks and 1 MIDI output port. The Express version was sometimes bundled with hardware such as a sound card. Cakewalk was a purely MIDI based sequencer: Although it could trigger WAV files at certain points, more comprehensive audio support was not incorporated until the advent of Cakewalk Pro Audio when true support for digitized audio was added.

Features 
The last version of the product featured a piano roll editor, support for limited music notation and a built-in scripting language called CAL (Cakewalk Application Language). Cakewalk was a predecessor of SONAR which had nearly all of the same features, including support for CAL, and was the only major DAW on the market supporting a scripting language.

Cakewalk had piano roll and CAL support since the Windows 16-bit Version 3.01.

See also 
 Cakewalk (company)
 List of music software
 Cakewalk Sonar
 Cakewalk by BandLab

References

Further reading

External links
Official website
Cakewalk Forum - independent forums for Cakewalk users
Sound On Sound review of Cakewalk Pro Audio 6 (archive.org)
Sound On Sound review of Cakewalk Pro Audio 7 (archive.org)

Audio editors
Software synthesizers